Firenze Waterpolo is an Italian water polo club from the city of Florence. Firenze is currently best known for its women's team, which was finalist of the 2013-14 LEN Trophy.

History 
The club established in 1996 as Firenze Pallanuoto. In 2012 the club merged with Fiorentina Waterpolo and created Firenze Waterpolo.

Honours 

women

LEN Trophy
 Runners-up (1): 2013-14

External links 
 Official site

References 

Water polo clubs in Italy
Sport in Florence
Sports clubs established in 1996
1996 establishments in Italy